Allen Theater may refer to:

 Allen Theatre, a theater in downtown Cleveland, Ohio
 Allen Theater (Allentown, Pennsylvania), a former cinema in Allentown, Pennsylvania